Ephyra was a village of Sicyonia, in the north of the Peloponnese, mentioned by Strabo, along with the river Selleeis, as situated near Sicyon. Ludwig Ross conjectures that some ruins situated upon a hill about 20 minutes southeast of Suli represent the Sicyonian Ephyra, but modern writers say it is unlocated.

References

Populated places in ancient Corinthia
Former populated places in Greece
Lost ancient cities and towns